Sursand Assembly constituency is an assembly constituency in Sitamarhi district in the Indian state of Bihar.

Overview
As per Delimitation of Parliamentary and Assembly constituencies Order, 2008, 26. Sursand Assembly constituency is composed of the following: Sursand, Charaut, and Pupri community development blocks.

Sursand Assembly constituency is part of 5. Sitamarhi (Lok Sabha constituency).

Members of Legislative Assembly

2020

References

External links
 

Assembly constituencies of Bihar
Politics of Sitamarhi district